Bernard Hutz (born 30 April 1961) is an Austrian ice hockey player. He competed in the men's tournaments at the 1984 Winter Olympics and the 1988 Winter Olympics.

References

1961 births
Living people
Austrian ice hockey players
Olympic ice hockey players of Austria
Ice hockey people from Ontario
Ice hockey players at the 1984 Winter Olympics
Ice hockey players at the 1988 Winter Olympics
Sportspeople from Kitchener, Ontario
20th-century Austrian people